Peter Hansen is a Republican member of the New Hampshire House of Representatives, representing Amherst. He was first elected in 2010. He was defeated in his fourth re-election bid in 2018.

In 2013, Hansen referred to women as "vaginas" in an e-mail to his House colleagues, as part of a discussion concerning the stand-your-ground law. After a widespread outcry, Hansen initially said the controversy had been "blown out of proportion", but later apologized for his choice of language.

Electoral history

References

Living people
Place of birth missing (living people)
Year of birth missing (living people)
Republican Party members of the New Hampshire House of Representatives
21st-century American politicians